Marco Andrés Gómez Muzzatti (born 19 April 2000) is a Venezuelan footballer who plays as a defender for Zulia.

Career statistics

Club

Notes

References

2000 births
Living people
Venezuelan footballers
Venezuela under-20 international footballers
Association football defenders
Venezuelan Primera División players
Zulia F.C. players
Sportspeople from Maracaibo
21st-century Venezuelan people